Defending champion Martina Navratilova defeated Andrea Jaeger in the final, 6–0, 6–3 to win the ladies' singles tennis title at the 1983 Wimbledon Championships. It was her fourth Wimbledon singles title and sixth major singles title overall.

Billie Jean King became the major oldest semifinalist in the Open Era at 39 years, 7 months and 9 days old. Chris Evert Lloyd's loss in the third round ended her streak of 34 consecutive major semifinals, dating back to the 1971 US Open.

Seeds

  Martina Navratilova (champion)
  Chris Evert Lloyd (third round)
  Andrea Jaeger (final)
  Tracy Austin (withdrew)
  Pam Shriver (second round)
  Bettina Bunge (first round)
  Wendy Turnbull (fourth round)
  Hana Mandlíková (fourth round)
  Sylvia Hanika (third round)
  Billie Jean King (semifinals)
  Barbara Potter (quarterfinals)
  Virginia Ruzici (fourth round)
  Jo Durie (third round)
  Andrea Temesvári (third round)
  Kathy Rinaldi (fourth round)
  Claudia Kohde-Kilsch (fourth round)

Tracy Austin withdrew due to injury. She was replaced in the draw by lucky loser Myriam Schropp.

Qualifying

Draw

Finals

Top half

Section 1

Section 2

Section 3

Section 4

Bottom half

Section 5

Section 6

Section 7

Section 8

References

External links

1983 Wimbledon Championships – Women's draws and results at the International Tennis Federation

Women's Singles
Wimbledon Championship by year – Women's singles
Wimbledon Championships
Wimbledon Championships